Hatakinhal is a village in Dharwad district of Karnataka, India.

Demographics 
As of the 2011 Census of India there were 82 households in Hatakinhal and a total population of 408 consisting of 224 males and 184 females. There were 60 children ages 0-6.

References

Villages in Dharwad district